Sonderkommando 2000 was a German counter intelligence unit established in Greece during its occupation by the Axis in WW II. It was based in Thessaloniki and aimed at infiltrating the Greek resistance movement in northern Greece.

Sources

German occupation of Greece during World War II
German occupation of Thessaloniki
World War II
Military units and formations of Germany in World War II